Homely Girl: A Life is a 1992 collection of three short stories by Arthur Miller.

In Britain, the collection was published under the title Plain Girl.

References

Short stories by Arthur Miller
1992 short story collections
Viking Press books